Conqueror of Atlantis (Il conquistatore di Atlantide, UK title: Kingdom in the Sand) is a 1965 Italian fantasy film adventure directed by Alfonso Brescia. Although the main character is called Herakles, this film was not part of the Italian "Hercules" film series of the 1960s. 

A poor quality pan & scan copy of the film is presented as a bonus feature on the DVD Goliath and the Dragon.

Cast
Kirk Morris ...  Herakles
Luciana Gilli ...  Virna
Piero Lulli ...  Ramir
Hélène Chanel ...  Queen Ming
Andrea Scotti ...  Karr
Mahmoud El-Sabbaa ...  Assur
Fortunato Arena ...  'Golden Ghost' Man
Livia Rossetti
Mohammed Tawfik
Caterina Trentini

Plot
After a ship wreckage Hercules finds himself on an unknown desert coast. He is found by princess Virna daughter of a nomad prince which takes care of the wounded Hercules. After a nightly assault Virna disappeared. Hercules starts to search her and finally finds her in a part of Atlantis in the desert where Virna had been selected to become the new heires after the current Queen Ming. Hercules gets captured by Ming's amazon guard who take to a mad scientist and the current queen.reveals that Virna is the reincarnation of Atlantis very first queen.

External links
 

1965 films
1960s Italian-language films
1960s fantasy adventure films
Italian fantasy adventure films
Films set in Atlantis
Peplum films
Sword and sandal films
1960s Italian films